Wellington Fagundes (born June 1, 1957) is a Brazilian politician. He has represented Mato Grosso in the Federal Senate since 2015. Previously he was a deputy from Mato Grosso from 1991 to 2015. He is a member of the Liberal Party (PL).

References

External links
 

Living people
1957 births
People from Rondonópolis
Liberal Party (Brazil, 2006) politicians
Liberal Party (Brazil, 1985) politicians
Brazilian Social Democracy Party politicians
Democratic Labour Party (Brazil) politicians
Democratic Social Party politicians
Members of the Federal Senate (Brazil)
Members of the Chamber of Deputies (Brazil) from Mato Grosso
Brazilian veterinarians